Equity is a 2016 American financial thriller film directed by Meera Menon, written by Amy Fox and starring Anna Gunn, James Purefoy, Sarah Megan Thomas, and Alysia Reiner.

The film premiered In Competition at the 2016 Sundance Film Festival on January 25, 2016. Shortly before its premiere, it was acquired for theatrical distribution by Sony Pictures Classics and was released in the United States on July 29, 2016 to positive critical reviews.

Plot
Naomi Bishop is a senior investment banker who deals with IPOs. After her latest project is undervalued she faces professional setbacks including clients losing confidence in her work. To bounce back she is hired to handle the IPO for Cachet, a privacy company with a social networking platform.

Around the same time Naomi bumps into Samantha Ryan, an old college classmate who now works as a federal prosecutor investigating white collar crime. Unbeknownst to Naomi, Samantha is investigating Naomi's on-again, off-again boyfriend Michael Connor, a broker at the same firm as Naomi who Samantha suspects is involved in insider trading. Michael tries to get information from Naomi about Cachet but fails.

While doing due diligence, Naomi learns from Marin, one of the coders, that Cachet is hackable. Despite having a nagging feeling that something is wrong, the numbers check out and Naomi continues to try to sell the shares of the company to investors. Michael, who has had no new insider trading tips to pass on to his friends at investment firm Titanite, tries unsuccessfully to hack into Naomi's phone.

Vice President Erin Manning, Naomi's assistant on the IPO, learns that Marin has been fired. To warn Naomi of this, she goes to Michael's home after not being able to reach Naomi and ends up leaking the information to him in the hope that he will be able to get her a promotion, something Naomi has been unable to do for her. Michael leaks the tips to his friends at Titanite and then sends the story to an old college roommate who is a tech journalist.

Naomi figures out that it was Erin who betrayed her, based on her having a green pen, the same type of pen that Michael uses. When the shares open, confidence is lost and the company loses a third of its value on the first day of trading.

Michael changes jobs to Titanite, neglecting to take Erin with him. Naomi is fired, while Erin assumes her position. Unable to crack the case from the outside, Samantha interviews for a high-paying corporate position, saying that she is in it for the money using words from a speech she heard Naomi give at an alumni event.

Cast
 Anna Gunn as Naomi Bishop
 James Purefoy as Michael Connor
 Sarah Megan Thomas as Erin Manning
 Alysia Reiner as Samantha Ryan
 Craig Bierko as Benji Akers
 Margaret Colin as Attorney Cahn
 Nate Corddry as Cory
 Samuel Roukin as Ed
 Lee Tergesen as Randall
 Sophie von Haselberg as Marin
 James Naughton as John
 Tracie Thoms as Melanie

Production
Meera Menon was brought on board to direct in March 2015. Anna Gunn signed on to star in June 2015 with James Purefoy joining shortly after.

Release

Box office
Equity grossed $1.6 million in the United States and Canada and $65,116 in other territories for a worldwide total of $1.7 million. Its widest release was in 255 theaters.

Critical reception
Equity received positive reviews from critics. On review aggregator site Rotten Tomatoes the film has an approval rating of 82%, based on 97 reviews, with an average rating of 6.4/10. The site's critical consensus reads, Equity brings a welcome change of perspective to the financial thriller genre, along with a nuanced story and a terrific cast led by a powerful effort from Anna Gunn." Metacritic, which assigns a weighted average rating to reviews from mainstream critics, gives the film a score of 68 out of 100, based on 29 reviews, indicating "generally favorable reviews".

Ignatiy Vishnevetsky of The A.V. Club wrote: "Equity may not be the fanciest or flashiest of financial thrillers—more like off-brand David Fincher or Steven Soderbergh—but it gets the job done. Its major players are all women trying to make careers in boys’ club professions [...]; that's all the motivation the movie offers and perhaps all that it really needs. It skips past the usual handwringing over the temptations of capitalist wealth and just gets right to the risk-taking and double-crossing, assuming (rightly) that viewers don't need a character to have a backstory, a tragic secret, and a dead spouse, best friend, or parent to understand why they'd do anything to hold on to a career."

References

External links
 
 
 
  (rating 3.5/5)

2016 films
American business films
American drama films
Trading films
Wall Street films
Sony Pictures Classics films
Films set in New York City
Films shot in New York City
Films shot in Philadelphia
Films directed by Meera Menon
2016 independent films
2010s English-language films
2010s American films